Abdollahabad (also Romanized as ‘Abdollāhābād) is a village in Ernan Rural District, in the Central District of Mehriz County, Yazd Province, Iran. At the 2006 census, its population was 99, in 40 families.

References 

Populated places in Mehriz County